The Ministry of Culture is the ministry of the Government of France in charge of national museums and the . Its goal is to maintain the French identity through the promotion and protection of the arts (visual, plastic, theatrical, musical, dance, architectural, literary, televisual and cinematographic) on national soil and abroad.

It is headed by the Minister of Culture, a cabinet member. The current officeholder has been  since 20 May 2022.

History

Deriving from the Italian and Burgundian courts of the Renaissance, the notion that the state had a key role to play in the sponsoring of artistic production and that the arts were linked to national prestige was found in France from at least the 16th century on. During the pre-revolutionary period, these ideas are apparent in such things as the creation of the Académie française, the Académie de peinture et de sculpture and other state-sponsored institutions of artistic production, and through the cultural policies of Louis XIV's minister Jean-Baptiste Colbert.

The modern post of Minister of Culture was created by Charles de Gaulle in 1959 and the first officeholders was the writer André Malraux. Malraux was responsible for realising the goals of the droit à la culture ("right to culture"), an idea which had been incorporated in the Constitution of France and the Universal Declaration of Human Rights (1948), by democratising access to culture, while also achieving the Gaullist aim of elevating the "grandeur" ("greatness") of post-war France.  To this end, he created numerous regional cultural centres throughout France and actively sponsored the arts. Malraux's artistic tastes included the modern arts and the avant-garde, but on the whole he remained conservative.

Under President François Mitterrand the Minister of Culture was Jack Lang who showed himself to be far more open to popular cultural production, including jazz, rock and roll, rap music, graffiti, cartoons, comic books, fashion and food. His famous phrase "économie et culture, même combat" ("economy and culture: it's the same fight") is representative of his commitment to cultural democracy and to active national sponsorship and participation in cultural production. In addition to the creation of the Fête de la Musique and overseeing the French Revolution bicentennial (1989), he was in charge of the massive architectural program of the François Mitterrand years (the so-called Grands travaux or "Great Works") that gave permission for the building of the Bibliothèque nationale, the new Louvre, the Arab World Institute, the Musée d'Orsay, the Opéra-Bastille, the "Grande Arche" of La Défense (the Parisian business quarter), the new seat of the French Ministry for the Economy and Finance, the Jean-Marie Tjibaou Cultural Centre, and the Cité des Sciences et de l'Industrie and Cité de la Musique, both in the Parc de la Villette.

The Ministry of Jacques Toubon was notable for a number of laws (the "Toubon Laws") enacted for the preservation of the French language, both in advertisements (all ads must include a French translation of foreign words) and on the radio (35% of songs on French radio stations must be in French), ostensibly in reaction to the presence of English.

Ministers of Culture
The following people were appointed as Minister of Culture of France:

 February 1959: André Malraux
 June 1969: Edmond Michelet
 October 1970: André Bettencourt
 January 1971: 
 April 1973: Maurice Druon
 March 1974: Alain Peyrefitte
 June 1974: 
 August 1976: Françoise Giroud
 March 1977: Michel d'Ornano
 April 1978: Jean-Philippe Lecat
 March 1981: Michel d'Ornano
 May 1981: Jack Lang
 March 1986: François Léotard
 May 1988: Jack Lang
 March 1993: Jacques Toubon
 May 1995: Philippe Douste-Blazy
 June 1997: Catherine Trautmann
 March 2000: Catherine Tasca
 May 2002: Jean-Jacques Aillagon
 March 2004: Renaud Donnedieu de Vabres
 May 2007: Christine Albanel
 June 2009: Frédéric Mitterrand
 May 2012: Aurélie Filippetti
 August 2014: Fleur Pellerin
 February 2016: Audrey Azoulay
 May 2017: Françoise Nyssen
 October 2018: Franck Riester
 July 2020: Roselyne Bachelot
 May 2022: Rima Abdul Malak

Names of the Ministry of Culture
Since the French constitution does not identify specific ministers (merely speaking of "the minister in charge of" this or that), each government may label each ministry as they wish, or even have a broader ministry in charge of several governmental sectors. Hence, the ministry has gone through a number of different names:

 1959: Ministère des Affaires culturelles
 1974: Ministère des Affaires culturelles et de l'Environnement
 1974: Secrétariat d'État à la Culture
 1976: Ministère de la Culture et de l'Environnement
 1978: Ministère de la Culture et de la Communication
 1981: Ministère de la Culture
 1986: Ministère de la Culture et de la Communication
 1988: Ministère de la Culture, de la Communication, des Grands Travaux et du Bicentenaire

 1991: Ministère de la Culture et de la Communication
 1992: Ministère de l'Éducation nationale et de la Culture
 1993: Ministère de la Culture et de la Francophonie
 1995: Ministère de la Culture
 1997: Ministère de la Culture et de la Communication
 2017: Ministère de la Culture

Organisation

Central administration
The Ministry of Culture is made up of a variety of internal divisions, including:
 Direction de l'administration générale (DAG)
 Direction de l'architecture et du patrimoine (DAPA) in charge of national monuments and heritage
 Inventaire général du patrimoine culturel maintains extensive databases of historical sites and objects via the Base Mérimée and monument historique status.
 Direction des archives de France (DAF) in charge of the National Archives
 Direction du livre et de la lecture (DLL) in charge of French literature and the book trade
 Direction de la musique, de la danse, du théâtre et des spectacles (DMDTS) in charge of music, dance and theater
 Direction des Musées de France (DMF) in charge of national museums

The Ministry has access to one inter-ministerial division:
 Direction du développement des médias (DDM) in charge of developing and expanding the French media (although French public television is run through the public-service company France Télévisions)

The Ministry also runs three "delegations" (administrative boards):
 Délégation aux arts plastiques (DAP) in charge of the visual and sculptural arts
 Délégation au développement et aux affaires internationales (DDAI) in charge of international affairs and French art
 Délégation générale à la langue française et aux langues de France (DGLFLF) in charge of the French language and languages of France

Finally, the Ministry shares in the management of the National Centre of Cinema (Centre national de la cinématographie), a public institution.

The Alliance française is run by the Ministry of Europe and Foreign Affairs.

Other services
On the national level, the Ministry also runs:
 Regional Cultural Affairs (Direction régionale des affaires culturelles, DRAC)
 Departmental Architecture and Monuments (Services départementaux de l'architecture et du patrimoine, SDAP)
 Departmental Archives under the direction of the departmental councils
 Centre National de la Danse, institution for the study and preservation of dance

Cultural activities
The Ministry of Culture is responsible for, or a major sponsor of, a number of annual cultural activities, including the Fête de la Musique, the Maison de la culture de Grenoble, the Festival d'Avignon, the Public Establishment of the Palace, Museum and National Estate of Versailles, the Joconde (online database of objects in French museums), the Base Mérimée (database of listed heritage monuments), and the Maître d'art program.

Further reading
 Nancy Marmer, "The New Culture: France '82," Art in America, December 1982, pp. 115–123, 181-189.

References

External links 

 
Culture Portal of the Ministry of Culture (Page index in English, documents in French)
Culture Portal of the Ministry of Culture 
English pages (Archive)

 
French culture
Culture ministers
Government ministries of France